David Woods may refer to:

David Woods (New York politician), a 19th-century American politician
David B. Woods, U.S. Navy admiral, former commandant Guantanamo prison camp
Dave Woods (commentator), British sports commentator
Dave Woods (rugby league, born 1966) (1966–1996), Australian rugby league footballer of the 1980s and 1990s
David Woods (rugby league, born 1970), Australian rugby league footballer of the 1980s, 1990s and 2000s
Dave Woods (rugby league coach) (born 1970), Australian rugby league footballer and coach
David Woods (water polo) (born 1944), Australian Olympic water polo player
David Woods (safety researcher), researcher in the field of resilience engineering

See also
David Wood (disambiguation)